Gaol Ferry Bridge is a footbridge in Bristol, England, that crosses the New Cut of the River Avon.

History
The bridge opened in 1935, replacing a ferry which crossed the New Cut near the old Bristol prison, known as the New Gaol. Unlike the Vauxhall Bridge downstream, the Gaol Ferry Bridge is a fixed bridge with no provision for the navigation of vessels unable to pass under it. However, by the 1930s, there was little navigation on the New Cut, and Vauxhall Bridge was last swung in 1936.

Repairs

Repair work on the bridge began in December 2021 with the bridge remaining open. At the time, it was expected that the bridge would close in January 2022 for around three months. On 5 August 2022, it was announced that the bridge would close on 22 August for repair work to take place. The work is expected to take between six and nine months and cost in the region of £1 million.

References 

Bridges completed in 1935
Pedestrian bridges in England
Bridges in Bristol
1935 establishments in England
Suspension bridges in the United Kingdom